Daniel Nestor and Kevin Ullyett won in the final 7–6(7–5), 7–5 against Thomas Shimada and Myles Wakefield.

Seeds

Draw

References
 2000 St. Petersburg Open Doubles Draw

St. Petersburg Open
St. Petersburg Open
2000 in Russian tennis